Toi te Taiao: the Bioethics Council was a government-sponsored council of New Zealand that was established in December 2002 and disestablished in 2009.

The Goal of the Bioethics Council is: "To enhance New Zealand's understanding of the cultural, ethical and spiritual aspects of biotechnology and ensure that the use of biotechnology has regard for the values held by New Zealanders."

Topics Covered
 Xenotransplantation
 Human Assisted Reproduction
 Nanotechnology

Notes

External links
 Council website

Bioethics research organizations
Government agencies of New Zealand